George Lukis Lang (23 February 1837 – 2 June 1898) was an English first-class cricketer.

The son of Arthur Lang, he was born at Harrow in February 1937. He was educated firstly at Harrow School, before attending Haileybury and Imperial Service College. Lang appeared three times in first-class cricket for the Gentlemen of England in 1856–57, making two appearances against the Gentlemen of Surrey and Sussex and once appearance against the Gentlemen of Kent and Sussex. He scored a total of 88 runs in his three matches, at an average of 29.33 and a high score of 50. With the ball, he took 9 wickets at a bowling average of 9.22 and best figures of 4 for 30. He left for British India in 1858, where he served in the Indian Civil Service until 1898. Lang died at Camberley in June 1898. His brother, Robert, also played first-class cricket.

References

External links

1837 births
1898 deaths
People from Harrow, London
People educated at Harrow School
People educated at Haileybury and Imperial Service College
English cricketers
Gentlemen of England cricketers
Indian Civil Service (British India) officers